The following is a timeline of the history of the city of Jacksonville, Florida, USA.

Prior to 20th century

 1564 - French Fort Caroline established by René Goulaine de Laudonnière.
 1565 - Spanish forces take Fort Caroline.
 1822
 Settlement named "Jacksonville" to honor Andrew Jackson.
 Town grid laid out.
 Jacksonville becomes seat of newly formed Duval County.
 1832
 Town incorporated.
 William J. Mills becomes mayor.
 1838 - Bethel Baptist Church established.
 1845 - Florida becomes part of the United States.
 1846 - October 12: Gale.
 1857 - City Park created.
 1858 - Florida, Atlantic & Gulf Central Railroad begins operating.
 1862 - Town occupied by Union forces.
 1869 - St. James Hotel built.
 1871 - Furchgott, Benedict & Co. dry goods store in business.
 1872 - Cookman Institute established.
 1873 - Florida Circulating Library active.
 1875 - Windsor Hotel built.
 1876
 Duval High School established.
 Union Congregational Church built.
 1877 - Board of Health established.
 1878 - Library and Literary Association formed.
 1881 - Florida Daily Times begins publication.
 1882
 Synagogue dedicated.
 Florida Baptist Academy established.
 1884 - Board of Trade organized.
 1885 - Park Opera House in business.
 1886 - Boylan Industrial Home and school established.
 1887
 Yellow fever epidemic.
 The Metropolis newspaper begins publication.
 St. Andrew's Episcopal Church built.
 1888 - Subtropical Exposition held.
 1890 - Population: 17,201.
 1892 - Edward Waters College active.
 1893 - Streetcars began operating.
 1897 - Woman's Club founded.
 1900 - 
 "Lift Every Voice and Sing" song first performed.
 Population: 28,429.

20th century

1900s-1950s
 1901
 May 3: Great Fire of 1901.
 Brewster Hospital established.
 Continental Hotel opens.
 1903
 Mason Park opens.
 Florida Automobile Association organized.
 1904
 Lincoln Park opens.
 First Baptist Church built.
 1905
 Jacksonville Free Public Library opens.
 Protestant Union Revival held.
 1907
 Manhattan Beach opens.
 Dixieland Amusement Park opens in South Jacksonville.
 South Jacksonville chartered as a city.
 1908 - Filmmaker Kalem Studios active.
 1909 - YMCA building constructed.
 1910
 Atlantic Boulevard laid out.
 Population: 57,699.
 1912
 St. James Building constructed.
 City Rotary Club formed.
 1914 - Jacksonville Zoological Park established.
 1917
 National Association for the Advancement of Colored People Jacksonville chapter established.
 John W. Martin becomes mayor.
 1920 – Population: 91,558.
 1921 - St. Johns River Bridge opens.
 1923 - John T. Alsop becomes mayor.
 1925
 Negro Welfare League organized.
 WJAX radio begins broadcasting.
 1926 - Carling Hotel opens.
 1927 - Florida Theatre and 5 Points Theatre built.
 1928 - Gator Bowl Stadium built.
 1929 - Jacksonville Historical Society founded.
 1930 – Population: 129,549.
 1934
 Jacksonville Junior College established.
 WMBR radio begins broadcasting.
 1938
 WJHP radio begins broadcasting.
 Theatre Jacksonville built.
 1940
 U.S. military Naval Air Station Jacksonville commissioned.
 Population: 173,065.
 1946 - Annual Gator Bowl college football game begins.
 1947
 Jacksonville Urban League formed.
 Hanna Park created.
 1949
 WJXT (television) begins broadcasting.
 W. Haydon Burns becomes mayor.
 1950 - Population: 204,517.
 1953 - Mathews Bridge opens.
 1955 - Jacksonville Expressway Authority established.
 1957 - WFGA-TV (television) begins broadcasting.

1960s-1990s
 1960
 August: "Ax Handle Saturday" racial unrest.
 Population: 201,030.
 1962 - Civic Auditorium opens.
 1963 - December- Hotel Roosevelt fire
 1964 - Hurricane Dora occurs.
 1967
 Hart Bridge opens.
 Mary Singleton and Sallye B. Mathis became the first female African Americans elected to the City Council.
 1968
 Consolidation of city and Duval County governments.
 Hans Tanzler becomes mayor.
 1970 - Population: 528,865.
 1973 - Florida Municipal Home Rule Powers Act ratified.
 1979 - Jake Godbold becomes mayor.
 1980
 Foreign trade zone established.
 Population: 540,920.
 1984 - Jacksonville Bulls football team formed.
 1989 - The Jacksonville Skyway begins operating
 1990 - Population: 635,230.
 1993 - Corrine Brown becomes U.S. representative for Florida's 3rd congressional district.
 1995
 Jacksonville Jaguars football team formed.
 Jacksonville Municipal Stadium opens.
 John Delaney becomes mayor.
 1998 - City website online (approximate date).
 2000
 "Better Jacksonville Plan" for urban growth approved.
 Population: 735,617.

21st century 
 2001 - Ander Crenshaw becomes U.S. representative for Florida's 4th congressional district.
 2003 - May 13: Jacksonville mayoral election, 2003 held; John Peyton wins.
 2010 - Population: 821,784.
 2011 - March 22: Jacksonville mayoral election, 2011 held; Alvin Brown wins. He was the city's first elected African-American mayor.
 2013 - Corrine Brown becomes U.S. representative for Florida's 3rd congressional district again.
 2015 - Lenny Curry becomes mayor.

See also
 History of Jacksonville, Florida
 List of mayors of Jacksonville, Florida
 National Register of Historic Places listings in Duval County, Florida
 Timelines of other cities in the North Florida area of Florida: Gainesville, Pensacola, Tallahassee

Notes

References

Bibliography

Published in 19th century

Published in 20th century
 
 
 1918 ed.
 
 1918 ed.
 1921 ed.
 
 
 
  Map
 
  (fulltext)

Published in 21st century

External links

 
 Digital Public Library of America. Items related to Jacksonville, Florida, various dates

Images

 
jacksonville
Jacksonville, Florida-related lists